Marlon Roniel Brandão (born 1 September 1963) is a Brazilian retired footballer who played as a forward.

Football career
Born in Marília, São Paulo, Brandão played for four clubs in his country, competing in the Série A with Guarani Futebol Clube and Santa Cruz Futebol Clube. In January 1987 he moved to Portugal where he remained for the following seven years, in representation of Sporting Clube de Portugal, C.F. Estrela da Amadora and Boavista FC.

Brandão's best season as a professional came in 1990–91, when he scored 11 goals in 31 games to help Boavista to the fourth position in the Primeira Liga. He retired in 1994 at only 30, after a few months with Spanish side Real Valladolid.

Honours
Sporting
Supertaça Cândido de Oliveira: 1987

Boavista
Taça de Portugal: 1991–92
Supertaça Cândido de Oliveira: 1992

References

External links

1963 births
Living people
People from Marília
Brazilian footballers
Association football forwards
Campeonato Brasileiro Série A players
Campeonato Brasileiro Série B players
Marília Atlético Clube players
Guarani FC players
Santa Cruz Futebol Clube players
Primeira Liga players
Sporting CP footballers
C.F. Estrela da Amadora players
Boavista F.C. players
La Liga players
Real Valladolid players
Brazilian expatriate footballers
Expatriate footballers in Portugal
Expatriate footballers in Spain
Brazilian expatriate sportspeople in Portugal
Brazilian expatriate sportspeople in Spain
Footballers from São Paulo (state)